Elfie Simchen  (born 11 July 1967) is a German freestyle skier. She was born in Ludwigsburg. She competed at the 1994 Winter Olympics in Lillehammer, in women's aerials. She won a silver medal in women's aerials at the FIS Freestyle World Ski Championships 1991.

References

External links 
 

1967 births
Living people
People from Ludwigsburg
Sportspeople from Stuttgart (region)
German female freestyle skiers
Olympic freestyle skiers of Germany
Freestyle skiers at the 1994 Winter Olympics
20th-century German women